Amsterdam Centraal Station (abbreviation: Asd) is the largest railway station in Amsterdam, North Holland, the Netherlands. A major international railway hub, it is used by 192,000 passengers a day, making it the second busiest railway station in the country after Utrecht Centraal and the most visited Rijksmonument of the Netherlands.

National and international railway services at Amsterdam Centraal are provided by NS, the principal rail operator in the Netherlands. Amsterdam Centraal is the northern terminus of Amsterdam Metro routes 51, 53, 54, and stop for 52 operated by municipal public transport operator GVB. It is also served by a number of GVB tram and ferry routes as well as local and regional bus routes operated by GVB, Connexxion and EBS.

Amsterdam Centraal was designed by Dutch architect Pierre Cuypers and opened in 1889. It features a Gothic, Renaissance Revival station building and a cast iron platform roof spanning approximately 40 metres.

Since 1997, the station building, underground passages, metro station, and the surrounding area have been undergoing major reconstruction and renovation works to accommodate the North-South Line metro route, which was opened on 22 July 2018. Amsterdam Centraal has the second longest railway platform in the Netherlands with a length of 695 metres.

History

Construction 

Amsterdam Centraal was designed by Pierre Cuypers, who is also known for his design of the Rijksmuseum in Amsterdam. While Cuypers was the principal architect, it is believed that he focused mostly on the decoration of the station building and left the structural design to railway engineers. The station was built by contractor Philipp Holzmann. The new central station replaced Amsterdam Willemspoort Station, which had closed in 1878, as well as the temporary Westerdok Station used from 1878 to 1889. The idea for a central station came from Johan Rudolph Thorbecke, then the Netherlands Minister of the Interior and responsible for the national railways, who, in 1884, laid two proposals before the Amsterdam municipal council. In the first proposal, the station would be situated between the Leidseplein and the Amstel river. In the other, it would be built in the open harbour front allowing for the station to be connected to the existing main lines in the area to the west and the south, but also to a projected new northern line.

Cuypers' design of the station building in many ways strongly resembled his other architectural masterpiece, the Rijksmuseum, of which the construction had begun in 1876. It features a palace-like, Gothic/Renaissance Revival facade, with two turrets and many ornamental details and stone reliefs referring to the capital city's industrial and commercial importance. Cuypers' station reflects the romantic nationalistic mood in the late nineteenth-century Netherlands, with its many decorative elements glorifying the nation's economic and colonial power at the time.

As with the Rijksmuseum, the station's overall architecture reminded many contemporaries of medieval cathedrals. For that reason, as well as for the fact that it became increasingly clear that the national government wanted the station to be built at the city's waterfront effectively separating the city from the IJ lake, the plan was highly controversial. In his book on the history of city, Amsterdam historian Geert Mak writes that: Almost all of Amsterdam's own experts and others involved thought this to be a catastrophic plan, 'the most disgusting possible attack on the beauty and glory of the capital'. Nevertheless, the building of the Central Station in front of the open harbour was forced through by the railway department of the Ministry of Transport in The Hague, and the Home Secretary, Thorbecke. Finally, the plan made its way through the Amsterdam municipal council by a narrow majority.

Construction works started in 1882. The station is built on three interconnected artificial islands in the IJ lake. These islands were created with sand taken from the dunes near Velsen, which had become available as a result of the excavation of the North Sea Canal. The islands together are known as Stationseiland (Station Island). Like many other structures in Amsterdam, the station was built on wooden piles (8,687 pieces). The construction of the station was delayed because of the instability of the soil, which set back the completion of the work by several years. The station building was completed in 1884, but the commission to Cuypers did not include the roofwork of the platforms. Therefore, the station did not yet feature its distinctive station roof. This roof, consisting of 50 curved trusses and a span of almost 45 meters, was designed by L.J. Eijmer, a civil engineer with the private railroad company Staatsspoorwegen. The roof was manufactured by Andrew Handyside and Company of Derby, England. Cuypers did design the decorations for the trusses and the gable ends. On 15 October 1889, the station was officially opened, drawing large numbers of crowds. The visitors were charged 0.25 guilders to see the station; in the first two days after the opening, several dozens of thousands paid. The opening of the central station marked the city's transition from a waterfront city to an inland city, spurring further redevelopment activities in the city centre which included the realignment of streets and the filling up of canals. The waterways would soon be replaced by tramways and cars as the primary modes of transport in the city.

In 1920, the East Wing of the station (the lower end of the building) was demolished and replaced by "The East", a postal service building designed by Cuypers' son Joseph. A second, narrower and longer but similar roof on the north side of the station was completed in 1922.

Early expansions and modernization 
In the 1950s, a pedestrian tunnel was created between the station and the road in front of it, which terminated inside the station. With the construction of the metro tunnel in the late 1970s, both the pedestrian tunnel and the road in front of the station disappeared. In the early 1980s, the central hall and middle tunnel were considerably widened and modernized. In the 1990s, a new signaling post was built on the western side of the station. In addition, the number of tracks on that side was expanded in order to increase capacity in the direction of Sloterdijk station. In 1996, a third, 'centre roof' designed by Jan Garvelink, architect at Holland Rail Consult, was built between the two existing roofs, whereby all platforms at the station were now covered.

Later reform and expansion 
Since 1997, the station has been continuously undergoing reconstruction works because of the development of the North-South Line of the Amsterdam Metro, which was originally planned to be completed in 2014. Due to several setbacks, some at the Amsterdam Centraal building site, the line was fully completed in 2018. Construction works at the station include a renovation of the station building, including the reconstruction of original station features which had disappeared over the years, a redevelopment of the Stationsplein (Station Square), and a new bus station on the north side of the station. In 2000, the new western passenger tunnel opened replacing the main tunnel in the centre of the station which was shut down enabling the construction of the new metro line. In 2004, platforms 10-15 were extended to accommodate international high-speed rail services. Construction works for the bus station commenced in 2003, opened in 2009 and finished in 2014. It includes the construction of a fourth station roof and a station hall with space for shops and restaurants. It replaces 5 small bus stations and several isolated bus stops across the Station Island. With all buses eventually moving to the new bus station on the north side, the Station Island should only be accessible to pedestrians, cyclists and trams.

The three passenger tunnels underneath the station were upgraded and provided with convenience stores and kiosks. In addition, two new passageways were created enabling the hosting of larger retail stores, geared towards passengers who have more time to spend at the station.

On 4 February 2020, the Minister of Infrastructure and Water Management, Cora van Nieuwenhuizen, and the UK Transport Secretary, Grant Shapps, announced that juxtaposed controls would be established in the station. According to the announcement, starting from 30 April 2020, Eurostar passengers travelling to the UK would clear exit checks from the Schengen Area as well as UK entry checks (conducted by the UK Border Force) in the station before boarding their train (without having to disembark at Brussels-South station, go through the juxtaposed controls there, and re-board the train before continuing their journey to the UK). However, the launch was postponed due to the COVID-19 pandemic. The inauguration of juxtaposed controls in the station subsequently took place on 26 October 2020.

From 2017 there will be further reconstruction works at the station. A number of platforms will be widened making use of the tracks which do not currently have platforms. This means that alterations will be made in the tunnels under the platforms again. Furthermore, the eastern tunnel will be made wider, based on the example of the middle tunnel. The old railway bridges to the east of the station will also be replaced.

Railway services
Amsterdam Centraal is a terminus station on many historical railway lines in the Netherlands: the Amsterdam–Rotterdam railway (1839), also known as the Oude Lijn, via Haarlem, Leiden and The Hague (Den Haag); the Den Helder–Amsterdam railway (1865), also known as the Staatslijn K, from Den Helder to Amsterdam via Alkmaar and Uitgeest; the Amsterdam-Zutphen railway (1874), also known as the Oosterspoorweg, via Hilversum, Amersfoort and Apeldoorn; the Amsterdam-Elten railway (1856), also known as the Rhijnspoorweg, via Utrecht and Arnhem; and the Amsterdam-Schiphol railway (1986), also known as the Westtak Ringspoorbaan.

As of December 2014, Amsterdam Centraal is served by 8 international rail routes and 22 national rail routes.

International rail

National rail
National rail services at the station are provided by NS, the principal rail operator in the Netherlands. NS offers four types of rail service from Amsterdam Centraal: Intercity Direct operating on the HSL-Zuid high-speed rail line, long-distance InterCity services, local Sprinter services, and the Nachtnet night service.

Railway station layout

Amsterdam Centraal has 15 tracks, 11 of which are alongside a platform: four island platforms with tracks along the full length on both sides (tracks 4/5, 7/8, 10/11, 13/14); one side platform with one track along the full length (track 15); and one bay platform with two tracks (tracks 1/2). Platforms 2-15 have an A-side (to the west) and a B-side (to the east). This means that there are 21 places where a train can be positioned for passenger access, with scissors crossings in the middle enabling trains to pass each other. Track 1 terminates short of the western end of the station building, which fronts track 2. Tracks 3, 6, 9, and 12 have no platform.

Diagram (platforms are yellow, tunnels are grey, north is up):

Other transport

Metro services

Amsterdam Centraal metro station (called Centraal Station on the Amsterdam Metro system) opened in 1980. It is the terminus station of three routes: Route 51 (Amsterdam Centraal - Isolatorweg), Route 53 (Amsterdam Centraal - Gaasperplas), and Route 54 (Amsterdam Centraal - Gein). In July 2018, the new Route 52 (Noord Station - Zuid Station) opened.

The metro station is only accessible with an OV-chipkaart smart card, the national fare system for public transport in the Netherlands. Disposable cards for one-hour, one-day or multiple-day use are available at ticket machines in the metro station hall.

As of 2018, the following metro services call at Centraal Station:

Tram services

Tram services at Amsterdam Centraal are provided from two tram stations on Stationsplein (Station Square), situated in front of the station's main entrance. Tram routes 2, 12, 13 and 17 call on the west side (Westzijde, Platform B) of the square, the other routes call on the east side (Oostzijde, Platform-A).

Bus services

City services

As of July 2018, GVB city bus routes 18, 21 and 22 and 48 depart from the new bus platform G on the lake side of the station (IJzijde or 'IJ side').

City nightbuses
Night bus services operate daily, starting around midnight and running until around 6 AM. From Monday to Thursday, night buses run once per hour. On Fridays, Saturdays, and Sundays, they run twice per hour. As of December 2014, all night buses depart from platform G on the lake side of the station and call at all main entertainment areas in Amsterdam's city centre, including Leidseplein and Rembrandtplein.

Noord Holland services

EBS (part of Egged) regional bus services depart from a new bus station on the IJ lake side of the station (beyond platform 15). This can be reached from the main central walkway via escalators. Connexxion bus services depart from the Kamperbrug bus stops on the city centre side of the station.

 305 (EBS - R-Net) Centraal Station - Schouw - Watergang - Ilpendam - Purmerend Tramplein - Zuidoostbeemster - Middenbeemster - De Rijp
 306 (EBS - R-Net) Centraal Station - Ilpendam - Purmerend Gors-Noord - Purmerend Wheermolen - Purmerend Overwhere
 314 (EBS - R-Net) Centraal Station - Broek in Waterland - Edam Bus Station - Oosthuizen - Scharwoude - Hoorn
 316 (EBS - R-Net) Centraal Station - Volendam East - Edam - Edam Bus Station Limited stop between Amsterdam and Volendam
 391 (Connexxion - R-Net) Centraal Station - Amsterdam Noord - Zaandam De Vlinder - Zaandam ZMC - Zaandam Kogerveld - Zaanse Schans
 393 (Connexxion - R-Net) Centraal Station - Amsterdam Noord - Zaandam De Vlinder - Zaandam-Zuid - Zaandam Zaans Medisch Centrum
 394 (Connexxion - R-Net) Centraal Station - Amsterdam Noord - Zaandam De Vlinder - Zaandam Zuid - Zaandam Station

Ferry services

Free of charge ferry services from Amsterdam Centraal to the borough of Amsterdam North across the IJ lake depart from the quay on the northern side of the station at the De Ruijterkade.

Just behind the station is the EYE Film Institute Netherlands, easily accessible with a free ferry.

See also
Railway stations in the Netherlands
List of tourist attractions in Amsterdam

References
Inline citations

General sources

External links

 
Amsterdam Centraal, project site about the station renovation

1880s establishments in the Netherlands
Centraal
Tram stops in Amsterdam
Buildings and structures completed in 1882
Pierre Cuypers buildings
Centraal
Railway stations in North Holland
Railway stations on the Oosterspoorweg
Railway stations on the Oude Lijn
Railway stations on the Rhijnspoorweg
Railway stations on the Staatslijn K
Railway stations on the Westtak Ringspoorbaan
Railway stations opened in 1889
Railway stations served by Eurostar
Rijksmonuments in Amsterdam
Juxtaposed border controls
Transit centers in the Netherlands
Railway stations in the Netherlands opened in the 19th century